NHHS may refer to:

 Nan Hua High School - Singapore
 New Hope High School - New Hope, Alabama
 New Hope High School - Columbus, Mississippi
 New Horizons High School - Delta Junction, Alaska
 Newport Harbor High School - Newport Beach, California
 North Hall High School - Hall County, Georgia
 North Hardin High School - Radcliff, Kentucky
 North Harford High School - Pylesville, Maryland
 New Haven High School (disambiguation) - multiple schools
 North Hollywood High School - North Hollywood, California
 North Hunterdon High School - Annandale, New Jersey
 North Hagerstown High School - Hagerstown, Maryland
 The proposed New Haven-Hartford-Springfield Commuter Rail Line, scheduled to be constructed along the Amtrak New Haven-Springfield Line.
 Student Union of the Norwegian School of Economics and Business Administration